Findlay Farm is a historic home and farm complex located at Peters Township in Franklin County, Pennsylvania. The house was built between 1825 and 1830, and is a -story, five-bay rubble limestone dwelling with a gable roof.  It has a full-length front porch added in the early 20th century.  Also on the property is a 19th-century frame barn.  The property was once owned by Pennsylvania Governor and U.S. Senator William Findlay (1768–1856), who sold it in 1823.

It was listed on the National Register of Historic Places in 1983.

References 

Farms on the National Register of Historic Places in Pennsylvania
Houses on the National Register of Historic Places in Pennsylvania
Houses completed in 1830
Houses in Franklin County, Pennsylvania
1830 establishments in Pennsylvania
National Register of Historic Places in Franklin County, Pennsylvania